The 2020 German Darts Championship was a PDC European Tour event on the 2020 PDC Pro Tour. The tournament took place at Halle 39, Hildesheim, Germany. It featured a field of 48 players and £140,000 in prize money, with £25,000 going to the winner. It was the second event on the 2020 European Tour.

Daryl Gurney was the defending champion after defeating Ricky Evans 8–6 in the final of the 2019 tournament, but he lost 6–2 to Danny Noppert in the quarter-finals.

Devon Petersen won his first PDC title, beating Jonny Clayton 8–3 in the final, which also meant he became the first player from Africa to win a PDC ranking title outside of Africa.

Prize money
This is how the prize money is divided, with the prize money being unchanged from the 2019 European Tour:

 Seeded players who lose in the second round and Host Nation invitees who lose in the first round do not receive this prize money on any Orders of Merit.

Qualification and format

The tournament used the qualifiers from the 2020 European Darts Grand Prix, which was planned to be held in March as the second tournament of the 2020 tour but was cancelled due to the COVID-19 pandemic.

The top 16 entrants from the PDC ProTour Order of Merit on 4 February automatically  qualify for the event and will be seeded in the second round.

The remaining 32 places go to players from four qualifying events and to two invitees – 24 from the Tour Card Holder Qualifier (held on 14 February), two from the Associate Member Qualifier (held on 24 September), two from the Host Nation Qualifier (held on 24 September), one from the Nordic & Baltic Associate Member Qualifier (held on 12 October 2019), and one from the East European Associate Member Qualifier (held on 8 February).

The two highest ranked German players on the Pro Tour Order of Merit on the cut-off date of 4 February also qualified.

From 2020, all Tour Card holders will enter into one qualifier instead of two separate ones for the UK and Europe. For this tournament, Daniel Larsson qualified as the Nordic & Baltic qualifier, even though he won a PDC Tour Card at 2020 Q-School, as this was due to the qualifying event taking place before Q-School.

Niels Zonneveld & Simon Stevenson withdrew prior to the draw and were replaced with additional Host Nation Qualifiers.

The following players will take part in the tournament:

Top 16
  Michael van Gerwen (third round)
  Ian White (second round)
  Gerwyn Price (second round)
  Peter Wright (third round)
  Dave Chisnall (quarter-finals)
  Krzysztof Ratajski (quarter-finals)
  Daryl Gurney (quarter-finals)
  Mensur Suljović (third round)
  James Wade (quarter-finals)
  Glen Durrant (third round)
  Joe Cullen (third round)
  Nathan Aspinall (third round)
  Jonny Clayton (runner-up)
  Rob Cross (third round)
  Adrian Lewis (second round)
  Jermaine Wattimena (second round)

Tour Card Qualifier
  Josh Payne (first round)
  Adam Hunt (second round)
  Jeffrey de Zwaan (first round)
  Steve Lennon (second round)
  Michael Smith (second round)
  Darren Penhall (first round)
  Jeff Smith (second round)
  Mervyn King (semi-finals)
  Jason Lowe (first round)
  Devon Petersen (champion)
  Steffen Siepmann (first round)
  William O'Connor (second round)
  Alan Tabern (first round)
  Ryan Murray (first round)
  Scott Waites (second round)
  Ron Meulenkamp (first round)
  Chris Dobey (second round)
  Steve Brown (first round)
  Danny Noppert (semi-finals)
  Reece Robinson (first round)
  Steve West (first round)
  Richard North (second round)

Associate Member Qualifier
  Ronny Huybrechts (first round)
  Cody Harris (first round)

Highest Ranked Germans
  Gabriel Clemens (second round)
  Max Hopp (third round)

Host Nation Qualifier
  Lukas Wenig (second round)
  Franz Rötzsch (first round)
  Nico Kurz (second round)
  Dragutin Horvat (second round)

Nordic & Baltic Qualifier
  Daniel Larsson (first round)

East European Qualifier
  Boris Koltsov (first round)

Draw

References 

2020 PDC Pro Tour
2020 PDC European Tour
2020 in German sport
September 2020 sports events in Germany